Michael Bennett Bloor (born 25 March 1949) is a Welsh former footballer who made 80 appearances in the Football League playing as a full back for Lincoln City and Darlington. He began his professional career with Stoke City, but never represented them in the league, and went on to play non-league football for Whitby Town.

Career statistics
Source:

References

1949 births
Living people
Footballers from Wrexham
Welsh footballers
Association football defenders
Stoke City F.C. players
Lincoln City F.C. players
Darlington F.C. players
Whitby Town F.C. players
English Football League players